The German torpedo boat T33 was one of fifteen Type 39 torpedo boats built for the Kriegsmarine (German Navy) during World War II. Completed in mid-1944, the boat was assigned to convoy escort duties and supporting German forces in the Baltic. She escorted a heavy cruiser in January 1945 as she bombarded Soviet troops and helped to evacuate troops and refugees from advancing Soviet forces in May. T33 was allocated to the Soviet Union after the war and was renamed Primerny. She served with the Baltic Fleet until 1954 when the ship was converted into an accommodation ship and renamed PKZ-63. She was turned over to be scrapped on 9 November 1956 and subsequently broken up.

Design and description
The Type 39 torpedo boat was conceived as a general-purpose design, much larger than preceding German torpedo boats. Their crew numbered 206 officers and sailors. The Type 39s were fitted with a pair of geared steam turbine sets, each driving one propeller, using steam from four high-pressure water-tube boilers.

As built, the Type 39 ships mounted four  SK C/32 guns in single mounts protected by gun shields; one forward of the superstructure, one between the funnels, and two aft, one superfiring over the other. Anti-aircraft defense was provided by four  SK C/30 AA guns in two twin-gun mounts on platforms abaft the rear funnel and a dozen  C/38 guns. One quadruple mount was positioned on the aft superstructure and two more were fitted on the bridge wings. They carried six above-water  torpedo tubes in two triple mounts amidships and could also carry 30 mines; the full complement of 60 mines made the ships top-heavy which could be dangerous in bad weather. For anti-submarine work the boats were fitted with a S-Gerät sonar and four depth charge launchers. The Type 39s were equipped with a FuMO 21 radar and various FumB radar detectors were installed late in the war.

Construction and career
T33 was ordered on 20 January 1941 from Schichau, laid down at their  Elbing, East Prussia, shipyard as yard number 1515, launched in 1943 and commissioned on 16 June 1944. After working up, the boat was deployed to support German forces operating in the Baltic. She was one of the escorts for the heavy cruiser  as the latter ship supported a German counterattack against advancing Soviet forces near Cranz, East Prussia, on 29–30 January 1945. Together with a pair of destroyers, T33 bombarded Soviet positions near Kolberg from 11 to 18 March to cover the evacuation of the city. The boat screened evacuation convoys from Hela, to friendly territory in early April. On 10 April, T33 towed the destroyer  after she had been badly damaged by a mine. On 5 May, she helped to ferry 45,000 refugees from East Prussia to Copenhagen, Denmark, and returned to help transport 20,000 more to Glücksburg, Germany, on the 9th.

T33 was allocated to the Soviet Union when the Allies divided the surviving ships of the Kriegsmarine amongst themselves in late 1945, and was assigned to the Baltic Fleet on 5 November. She was taken over by a Soviet crew on New Year's Day 1946, who raised the Soviet naval jack aboard her four days later. Renamed Primerny on 13 February 1946, the newly reclassified destroyer joined the North Baltic Fleet two days later. She served with the latter until 30 November 1954, when she was removed from combat duty and converted into a floating barracks before being renamed PKZ-63 on 28 December. The vessel was transferred for scrapping on 9 November 1956, which was carried out by the Main Directorate for the Procurement, Processing and Sale of Secondary Ferrous Metals at Tallinn during 1957 and 1958.

Notes

Citations

References

External links
 T33 at german navy.de
Primerny photo gallery on navsource.narod.ru

Type 39 torpedo boats
1943 ships
Ships built by Schichau
Ships built in Elbing